The 2020 Samoa National League is the 30th edition of the Samoa National League, the top association football league of Samoa organised by the Football Federation Samoa. This season began on 18 August 2020. Lupe o le Soaga are the defending champions.

The winner of the first round will qualify for the 2021 OFC Champions League, while the winner of the top eight round will qualify for the 2022 OFC Champions League.

The league was won by Lupe o le Soaga.

Many games take place at the 3,500-capacity National Soccer Stadium, Apia.

Teams
A total of 12 teams from the island of Upolu. There were no promotion and relegation from the 2019 Samoa National League.
Kiwi
Lepea
Lupe o le Soaga
Moaula United
Moata'a
Togafuafua Saints
Fa'atoia United
Sogi
Vaipuna
Vaitele Uta
Vaiusu
Vaivase-Tai

Stadiums

First round

Top eight round

References

Samoa National League seasons
Samoa
National League